Screening Enlightenment: Hollywood and the Cultural Reconstruction of Defeated Japan is a 2010 non-fiction book by Hiroshi Kitamura, an assistant professor of history at the College of William and Mary.

References

2010 non-fiction books
English-language books
Cornell University Press books
Works about the history of Hollywood, Los Angeles